Arecoline is a nicotinic acid-based mild parasympathomimetic stimulant alkaloid found in the areca nut, the fruit of the areca palm (Areca catechu). It is an odourless oily liquid. It can bring a sense of enhanced alertness and energy, euphoria and relaxation. Its psychoactive effects are comparable to that of nicotine.

Chemistry
Arecoline is a base, and its conjugate acid has a pKa ~ 6.8.
Arecoline is volatile in steam, miscible with most organic solvents and water, but extractable from water by ether in presence of dissolved salts. Being basic, arecoline forms salts with acids. The salts are crystalline, but usually deliquescent: the hydrochloride, arecoline•HCl, forms needles, m.p. 158 °C; the hydrobromide, arecoline•HBr, forms slender prisms, mp. 177–179 °C from hot alcohol; the aurichloride, arecoline•HAuCl4, is an oil, but the platinichloride, arecoline2•H2PtCl6, mp. 176 °C, crystallizes from water in orange-red rhombohedrons. The methiodide forms glancing prisms, mp. 173-174 °C.

Pharmacology 

Arecoline is the primary active ingredient responsible for the central nervous system effects of the areca nut.  Arecoline has been compared to nicotine; however, nicotine agonizes nicotinic acetylcholine receptors,  whereas  arecoline is primarily a partial agonist of muscarinic acetylcholine receptors, leading to its parasympathetic effects. In frogs, arecoline also acts as an antagonist (or very weak partial agonist) at α4 and α6-containing nicotinic acetylcholine receptors and as a silent antagonist at α7 nicotinic receptors, which may account for its anti-inflammatory activity. Arecoline also inhibits AMPK through generation of ROS in several types of cells.

Nervous system 
Arecoline promotes excitation and decreases sleeping time. It also enhances learning and memory. Intraperitoneal administration of arecoline decreases locomotor activity dose-dependently. Arecoline reversed scopolamine induced memory loss. It could also decrease symptoms of depression and schizophrenia

Cardiovascular system 
AN (Areca Nut) is a vasodilator mainly due to the presence of arecoline. It also has anti-thrombosis and anti-atherogenic effects by increasing plasma nitric oxide, eNos, and mRNA expression and decreasing IL-8 along with other downregulations.

Endocrine system 
It increases the level of testosterone by stimulating Leydig's cells as well as levels of FSH and LH. It also activates HPA axis and stimulates CRH release. It prevents the dysfunction of B cells of the pancreas from high fructose intake.

Digestive system 
Arecoline has the ability to stimulate the digestive system through the activation of muscarinic receptors. Areca nut water extract could increase the contractions of gastric smooth muscle and muscle strips of the duodenum, ileum, and colon significantly. This activity could be caused by arecoline.

Pharmacokinetic 
Arecoline is metabolized by both kidneys and liver. Currently, 11 metabolites of arecoline are documented among which N-methylnipecotic acid was found to be a major metabolite of both arecoline and arecaidine. Lime is said to hydrolyse almost all arecoline to arecaidine, a GABA reuptake inhibitor. Arecaidine is also formed during liver metabolism of arecoline in rats.

Uses 

Owing to its muscarinic and nicotinic agonist properties, arecoline has shown improvement in the learning ability of healthy volunteers. Since one of the hallmarks of Alzheimer's disease is a cognitive decline, arecoline was suggested as a treatment to slow down this process and arecoline administered intravenously did indeed show modest verbal and spatial memory improvement in Alzheimer's patients, though due to arecoline's possible carcinogenic properties, it is not the first drug of choice for this degenerative disease. In many Asian cultures, the areca nut is chewed along with betel leaf to obtain a stimulating effect.

Arecoline has also been used medicinally as an antihelmintic (a drug against parasitic worms).
Arecoline has also been shown to increase testosterone in rats, in low doses.

Toxicity 
: 100 mg/kg, administered subcutaneously in mouse. Also, the minimum lethal dose (MLD) values of arecoline in mice, dog and horse is 100 mg/kg, 5 mg/kg and 1.4 mg/kg respectively. It causes Oral Submucous Fibrosis by stimulating collagen, interleukin 6, keratinocyte growth factor-1, IGF-1, cystatin C, tissue inhibitor of matrix metalloproteinases in the mouth.
Current science is confident that areca nut chewing is carcinogenic. Research suggests this is probably at least partly because of arecoline itself, although it could also be from the other constituents of the nut as well, some of which are precursors to nitrosamines that form in the mouth during chewing. Section 5.5 Evaluation on page 238 of IARC Monograph 85-6 states the following: 
 [...]

 There is sufficient evidence in humans for the carcinogenicity of betel quid without tobacco. Betel quid without tobacco causes oral cancer.

 There is sufficient evidence in experimental animals for the carcinogenicity of betel quid without tobacco.

 There is sufficient evidence in experimental animals for the carcinogenicity of betel quid with tobacco.
 There is sufficient evidence in experimental animals for the carcinogenicity of areca nut.

 There is sufficient evidence in experimental animals for the carcinogenicity of areca nut with tobacco.

 There is limited evidence in experimental animals for the carcinogenicity of arecoline.

 There is inadequate evidence in experimental animals for the carcinogenicity of arecaidine.

 [...]Toxicity of Arecoline can be partially mitigated by Vitamins C and E.

Synthesis
Although an older method was described in the patent literature, this is less attractive than the modern methods.

Fischer esterification of nicotinic acid (niacin) (1) gives methyl nicotinate [93-60-7] (2). Alkylation with methyl iodide then gives Iodonicot (Cesol iodide) [4685-10-3] (3). Coordination of the methyl cation to the nitrogen lone pair disrupts the aromaticity of the pyridine system. Hydride reduction with an agent such as potassium borohydride thus gives the tetrahydropyridine (4). Salt formation with HBr completes the synthesis (5).

A double Mannich reaction between methylamine (1), acetaldehyde (2) and formaldehyde (3) in the presence of hydroxylamine hydrochloride is supposed to have delivered 1-methyl-1,2,5,6-tetrahydropyridine-3-carbaldehyde oxime hydrochloride Fb: [139886-54-7] (4) as the product. Dehydration of the aldoxime to the nitrile occurs upon treatment with acetic anhydride giving 3-cyano-1-methyl-1,2,5,6-tetrahydropyridine [5657-66-9] (5). FGI of the nitrile to the methyl carboxylate ester then occurs upon acid catalyzed treatment with methanol, and then conversion to the HBr salt completes the synthesis.

See also 
Chavibetol
Muscarine

References 

Muscarinic agonists
Nicotinic agonists
Alkaloids
Carboxylate esters
Tetrahydropyridines
Methyl esters
Plant toxins